Wyomissing Area School District is a diminutive, suburban, public school district located in Berks County, Pennsylvania. The district is the smallest one operating in Berks County. According to 2000 federal census data, it serves a resident population of 12,440. By 2010, the district's population declined to 12,359 people. In 2009, the district residents’ per capita income was $35,814, while the median family income was $70,875. In the Commonwealth, the median family income was $49,501  and the United States median family income was $49,445, in 2010. By 2013, the median household income in the United States rose to $52,100.

Wyomissing Area School District operates three schools: Wyomissing Area Junior/Senior High School, West Reading Elementary Center, and Wyomissing Hills Elementary Center. The district is one of 19 public school districts operating in Berks County, Pennsylvania. The district is one of the 500 public school districts of Pennsylvania. The West Reading School District and Wyomissing School District officially merged into the Wyomissing Area School over several years finalizing the process in 1969.

Extracurriculars
Wyomissing Area School District offers a wide variety of clubs, activities and an extensive sports program.

Sports
The district funds:

Boys
Baseball - AAA
Basketball- AAA
Bowling - AAAA
Cross Country - AA
Football - AA
Golf - AA
Indoor Track and Field - AAAA
Lacrosse - AAAA
Soccer - AA
Swimming and Diving - AA
Tennis - AA
Track and Field - AA
Volleyball - AA
Wrestling	- AA

Girls
Basketball - AA
Bowling - AAAA
Cross Country - AA
Indoor Track and Field - AAAA
Field Hockey - AA
Lacrosse - AAAA
Soccer (Fall) - AA
Softball - AA
Swimming and Diving - AA
Girls' Tennis - AA
Track and Field - AA
Volleyball - AA

Junior High School Sports

Boys
Baseball
Basketball
Cross Country
Football
Lacrosse
Soccer
Track and Field
Wrestling	

Girls
Basketball
Cross Country
Field Hockey
Lacrosse
Softball 
Track and Field
Volleyball

According to PIAA directory July 2013

References

School districts in Berks County, Pennsylvania
School districts established in 1909
1909 establishments in Pennsylvania